Cristian Lizzori (born 2 April 1980) is an Italian former footballer who played as a defender.

Career
Born in Codogno, Lombardy region, Lizzori started his career at Lombard and Serie A club Internazionale. In 2000, he graduated from Primavera Under-20 team and joined Arezzo along with Giovanni Passiglia, Nello Russo and Giuseppe Ticli. He made his Serie B debut on 2 September 2002, the round 2 match against Messina as starter. The match ended in 1-1 draw. In June 2001, he was bought back by Inter and loaned to Ternana. Ternana then signed Lizzori in co-ownership deal for 500 million lire (€258,228) in June 2002 and then loaned to Viterbese. In June 2003, Ternana bought Lizzori and Davide Sinigaglia outright from Inter for €500 each  But he then joined Spezia in another co-ownership deal, which Spezia at that time partially owned by Inter. Inter team-mate Luca Ceccarelli and Nicola Napolitano also joined the club on loan. He left the club in January 2005 after signed defender Hernán Paolo Dellafiore from Inter.

He then spent 2005–06 season at Sicilian side Vittoria and in January 2007 left for Pro Vercelli.

In 2007-08 season Lizzori he left for Sardinian side Sassari Torres. After the club folded, Lizzori retired.

Honours
Coppa Italia Serie C: 2004–05 (Spezia)

Footnotes

References

External links
 

Italian footballers
Serie B players
S.S. Arezzo players
Ternana Calcio players
U.S. Viterbese 1908 players
Spezia Calcio players
F.C. Pro Vercelli 1892 players
Association football central defenders
Sportspeople from the Province of Lodi
1980 births
Living people
F.C. Vittoria players
Footballers from Lombardy